Paul Bechtner (December 19, 1847February 12, 1914) was an American newspaper editor, manufacturer, and politician.

Biography
Paul Bechtner was born in Stuttgart, Württemberg, Germany on December 19, 1847. He emigrated to the United States in 1848, and settled in Milwaukee, Wisconsin in 1868. Bechtner was the publisher of Abendpost, a German-language newspaper. He was a manufacturer and manager of the Exposition Building in Milwaukee.

In 1878, Bechtner was elected school commissioner and, in 1884, was elected president of the school board. In 1884, he was president of the Milwaukee County Insane Asylum Board of Trustees. In 1886, Bechtner served on the Milwaukee Common Council. A Republican, he served in the Wisconsin Senate from 1891 to 1895. He unsuccessfully ran for mayor of Milwaukee in 1892.

Bechtner died at his daughter's house in Milwaukee on February 12, 1914, after a long illness.

References

1847 births
1914 deaths
German emigrants to the United States
Editors of Wisconsin newspapers
Businesspeople from Wisconsin
Milwaukee Common Council members
School board members in Wisconsin
Republican Party Wisconsin state senators
19th-century American politicians
19th-century American businesspeople